84th Regiment or 84th Infantry Regiment may refer to:

 84th Regiment of Foot (1759), a unit of the British Army, active from 1759 to 1765, which served entirely in British India 
 84th Regiment of Foot (Royal Highland Emigrants), a unit of the British Army, active from 1775 to 1784, which served in the American Revolutionary War 
 84th (York and Lancaster) Regiment of Foot, a unit of the British Army, active from 1793 to 1881, which served in the Napoleonic Wars and in India 
 84th Infantry Regiment (Philippine Commonwealth Army), a unit of the Philippine Commonwealth Army, active from 1942 to 1946, which served in the Second World War 

American Civil War
 84th Illinois Volunteer Infantry Regiment, a unit of the Union (North) Army 
 84th Regiment Indiana Infantry, a unit of the Union (North) Army
 84th New York Volunteer Infantry Regiment, a unit of the Union (Northern) Army 
 84th Ohio Infantry, a unit of the Union (Northern) Army 
 84th Pennsylvania Infantry, a unit of the Union (Northern) Army

See also
 84th Division (disambiguation)
 84th Wing (disambiguation)
 84th Squadron (disambiguation)